Lapa Terminal is a bus terminal in the western part of São Paulo, Brazil.

References

Transport in São Paulo
Bus stations in Brazil